The LFG Roland D.III was a fighter aircraft produced in Germany during World War I.

Design and development
The D.III was a further development of the D.I fighter. These machines had a fuselage that completely filled the interplane gap, a design feature intended to improve aerodynamics. However, it also resulted in limiting the pilot's field of vision in the down and forward direction, leading to complaints. LFG attempted to remedy this in the D.III design by introducing a gap between the upper fuselage and the upper wing, braced by cabane struts. The size of the tailplane was also increased.

While this did indeed result in an improvement over the Roland D.II that had preceded it, the performance of the D.III was inferior to that of other contemporary fighters available to the German Army, in particular those produced by Albatros, and the aircraft was therefore only produced in small quantities.

Forward visibility, though better in the D.III than the D.I was still not good and LFG tried to improve it with another variant, the D.V. The fuselage diameter was decreased and the decking forward of the cockpit lowered exposing all of the upper parts of the engine cylinders.  Three were built, one with the Argus engine of the D.II and two with the   Mercedes D.III, another upright 6-cylinder engine.  The visibility was not much improved and the problem was only solved with the LFG Roland D.VII, which used a V-8 engine.

Variants
D.V Lowered fuselage to improve pilot's view.  Three built, one with Argus and two with Mercedes engines.

Operators

Bulgarian Air Force

Luftstreitkrafte

Specifications (D.III)

Notes

Bibliography

External links
 Уголок неба

1910s German fighter aircraft
D.III
Aircraft first flown in 1916